Pevomayskoye is a rural locality (a selo) and the administrative center of Pevomaysky Selsoviet, Biysky District, Altai Krai, Russia. The population was 5,454 as of 2013. There are 44 streets.

Geography 
Pevomayskoye is located 9 km north of Biysk (the district's administrative centre) by road. Prigorodny is the nearest rural locality.

References 

Rural localities in Biysky District